Meanwhile...Back at the Lab is the eighth studio album by American rock band Slightly Stoopid. It was released on June 29, 2015. "The Prophet" first appeared as a hidden track on their 1996 debut album Slightly $toopid.

Track listing
 "Dabbington" - 2:32
 "This Version" - 3:59
 "The Prophet" - 3:14
 "Hold It Down" - 3:15
 "Fades Away" - 3:10
 "F**k You" (feat. Beardo) - 2:11
 "Time Won't Wait" - 4:30
 "Rolling Stone" - 3:59
 "Guns in Paradise" - 3:38
 "Come Around" - 3:44
 "Call Me Crazy" - 2:42
 "One Bright Day" (feat. Angela Hunte) - 3:11
 "Life Rolls On" - 3:39
 "What Your Friends Say" - 3:16

Charts

References

Slightly Stoopid albums
2015 albums